Pterosporidium is a genus of fungi in the Phyllachoraceae family. The genus contain two widely distributed species that grow on mangrove leaves.

References

Sordariomycetes genera
Phyllachorales